Rotman is a settlement in the Municipality of Juršinci in northeastern Slovenia. It lies in the vineyard-covered Slovene Hills in the traditional region of Styria. It is now included with the rest of the municipality in the Drava Statistical Region.

The village chapel-shrine with a belfry dates to the late 19th century.

References

External links

Rotman on Geopedia

Populated places in the Municipality of Juršinci